Nguyễn Xuân Ôn (1825–1889) was a Vietnamese anti-French nationalist revolutionary, who led the Cần Vương's military operations in Kim Liên in north central Vietnam. He was captured after a former bodyguard was caught by the French and forced to lead an attack on On's headquarters in 1887. He was jailed and died in custody.

References

Vietnamese nationalists
Vietnamese revolutionaries
1825 births
1889 deaths
Nguyễn dynasty poets